Robert Melvin Adams (born January 6, 1952) is a former professional baseball first baseman and catcher. He played 15 games in Major League Baseball for the Detroit Tigers in 1977, mostly as a pinch hitter. Of the three games he played in the field, two were at first base and one was at catcher. In just 24 major league at bats, Adams hit two home runs, both solo. Prior to the 1977 season his manager, Ralph Houk, said that he "played no position well" but "might be of help".

References

External links
, or Retrosheet, or Pura Pelota (Venezuelan Winter League)

1952 births
Living people
Baseball players from Pittsburgh
Detroit Tigers players
Evansville Triplets players
Lakeland Tigers players
Major League Baseball catchers
Major League Baseball first basemen
Montgomery Rebels players
Navegantes del Magallanes players
UCLA Bruins baseball players
American expatriate baseball players in Venezuela